Admiral Buckle may refer to:

Claude Buckle (Royal Navy officer, born 1803) (1803–1894), British Royal Navy admiral
Claude Buckle (Royal Navy officer, born 1839) (1839–1930), British Royal Navy admiral
Matthew Buckle (1716–1784), British Royal Navy admiral